Warren Petryk (born January 24, 1955) is an American Republican politician in the Wisconsin State Assembly. He has been a member of the Assembly since 2011, representing Pierce County, Pepin County, and parts of Eau Claire, Dunn, St. Croix, and Buffalo counties. He has been the Chair of Assembly Committee on Workforce Development since 2015.

Early life and education
Petryk was born on January 24, 1955, and grew up in Boyceville, Wisconsin, in Dunn County. He obtained the highest honor of the Boy Scouts of America by obtaining the rank of Eagle Scout in 1969. He graduated as valedictorian from Boyceville High School in 1973.

Petryk attended the University of Wisconsin–Stout and earned a Bachelor of Arts degree in Philosophy with highest honors from the University of Wisconsin–Eau Claire in 1978.

Career
In 1972, during high school, Petryk co-founded the musical entertainment group "The Memories." He continues to actively perform as part of "The Memories" at venues in the Midwest and across the United States.

In 1996, Petryk began working for United Cerebral Palsy of West Central Wisconsin, where he spent 15 years working in community relations.

Awards and memberships
Recipient of Wisconsin Veterans of Foreign Wars Legislator of the Year in 2013; AMVETS Veteran's Advocate of the Year in 2014; Wisconsin Electrical Cooperative Association's Most Enlightened Legislator in 2016; Wisconsin School Nutrition Association's Legislator of the Year in 2016; Wisconsin Manufacturers and Commerce Working Wisconsin Award (every term); Dairy Business Association's Legislative Excellence Award (every term); Wisconsin Economic Development Association's Champion of Economic Development Award in 2018; Wisconsin Towns Association's Friend of Towns Award in 2018 and 2020; Wisconsin Counties Association's Outstanding Legislator Award in 2020; and the Wisconsin Association for Talented and Gifted's Outstanding Legislator Award in 2020.

Petryk is a member of the Eau Claire, Menomonie, Ellsworth, and Prescott Chambers of Commerce; the National Rifle Association; Eau Galle-Rush River, Ellsworth, Durand, Rock Falls, and Arkansaw Sportsmen's Clubs; Wisconsin Farm Bureau; Sons of the American Legion; Cleghorn Lions Club; and the Board of Directors of the Chippewa Valley Council of the Boys Scouts of America.

Petryk defeated Jeff Smith in the 2010, 2012, and 2014 Wisconsin State Assembly races. He was unopposed in 2016. In 2018 and 2020, he defeated Mondovi real estate broker Charlene "Charlie" Warner.

Electoral history

References

External links
Representative Warren Petryk at Wisconsin Legislature
Petryk for Assembly Campaign Website
Warren Petryk at Ballotpedia
Profile at Vote Smart
The Memories (Business Website)

University of Wisconsin–Eau Claire alumni
Republican Party members of the Wisconsin State Assembly
Living people
1955 births
21st-century American politicians
People from Eau Claire, Wisconsin